Oleksandr Volodymyrovych Zakharov (born 19 June 1966) is a former Soviet and Ukrainian professional footballer.

Club career
He made his debut in the Soviet First League in 1984 for SC Tavriya Simferopol.

References

1966 births
Living people
Soviet footballers
Ukrainian footballers
Association football midfielders
Soviet First League players
Ukrainian Premier League players
SC Tavriya Simferopol players
FC Chayka Sevastopol players
FC Naftovyk-Ukrnafta Okhtyrka players
FC Elektron Romny players
FC Krystal Kherson players